Owen Green (born 9 September 1998) is an English footballer who plays as a defender for Lexington SC in the USL League One.

Career

Youth, College & Amateur
Green was born in Leicester, England to an English father and Filipino mother. He was raised in Miami, Florida, attending Doral Academy Preparatory School.

In 2017, Green attended Florida International University to play college soccer. In four seasons with the Panthers, Green made 41 appearances, scoring three goals and tallying five assists.

While at college, Green played in the USL League Two with Weston FC in 2018, and with South Georgia Tormenta 2 in 2021.

Professional
On 1 April 2022, Green moved up to Tormenta's USL League One side South Georgia Tormenta. He made his debut for the club on 7 April, appearing as an injury-time substitute during a 1–0 win over Charleston Battery in the U.S. Open Cup. Green's Tormenta FC team won the 2022 USL League One championship.

On 13 January 2023, Green signed with USL League One expansion club Lexington SC.

References

External links 
 

1998 births
Living people
American soccer players
American people of English descent
American sportspeople of Filipino descent
Association football defenders
Soccer players from Florida
Sportspeople from Miami
FIU Panthers men's soccer players
Weston FC players
Tormenta FC 2 players
Tormenta FC players
Lexington SC players
USL League Two players
USL League One players